Inácio is a common Spanish/Portuguese given name (previously spelled "Ignácio"; "Inácio" is modern orthography) and occasionally a surname.  

Examples as a surname include:
Alisha Inacio, American professional wrestler and manager
Augusto Inácio, former Portuguese football player
Bankrol Hayden, American rapper born as Hayden Inacio
Justin Inacio, Canadian professional lacrosse player
Piá, real name João Batista Inácio, Brazilian football player
Joelson, real name Joelson José Inácio, Brazilian football player

Examples as a given name include:
Lula, real name Luiz Inácio da Silva, president of Brazil
Manuel Inácio da Silva Alvarenga, Brazilian poet
Inácio Carneiro dos Santos (born 1996), Brazilian footballer known simply as Inácio

See also
Ignacio

Given names
Surnames
Portuguese-language surnames